Gloucester and Macquarie was an electoral district of the Legislative Assembly in the Australian state of New South Wales in the first and second Parliaments (1856-1859), named after Gloucester and Macquarie counties on the Mid North Coast.

Members for Gloucester and Macquarie

Election results

1856

1858

References

Gloucester and Macquarie
1856 establishments in Australia
1859 disestablishments in Australia
Constituencies established in 1856
Constituencies disestablished in 1859